You'anmen Subdistrict is one of the 14 subdistricts of Fengtai District, Beijing, China. It is located on the eastern part of Fengtai, south of Baizhifang and Taoranting Subdistricts, west of Yongdingmenwai Subdistrict, north of Xiluoyuan Subdistrict, and east of Nanyuan, Lugouqiao and Taipingqiao Townships. The subdistrict is home to a population of 73,499 as of 2020.

The subdistrict got its name You'anmen from the former city gate of Beijing's outer city wall that used to stand in the region.

History

Administrative Division 
As of 2021, You'anmen Subdistrict is divided into 20 subdivisions, with 18 communities and 2 villages:

Landmark 

 Beijing Liao and Jin City Wall Museum

See also 

 List of township-level divisions of Beijing

References 

Fengtai District
Subdistricts of Beijing